These are the Billboard Hot 100 number one hits of 1961.

That year, 16 acts achieved their first number one song, such as Bert Kaempfert, The Shirelles, Lawrence Welk, The Marcels, Del Shannon, Ernie K-Doe, Roy Orbison, Gary U.S. Bonds, Bobby Lewis, Joe Dowell, The Highwaymen, Bobby Vee, Dion, Jimmy Dean, The Marvelettes, and The Tokens. Pat Boone, despite having most of his songs hit number one prior to the creation of the Hot 100, earns his first number one song on the chart.

Chart history

Number-one artists

See also
1961 in music
List of Billboard number-one singles

References

Sources
Fred Bronson's Billboard Book of Number 1 Hits, 5th Edition
Joel Whitburn's Top Pop Singles 1955-2008, 12 Edition
Joel Whitburn Presents the Billboard Hot 100 Charts: The Sixties
Additional information obtained can be verified within Billboard's online archive services and print editions of the magazine.

1961 record charts
1961